Aaron Gervais is a Canadian composer of contemporary classical music who lives in San Francisco.

He studied jazz performance at Grant MacEwan College and the University of Toronto, and composition at the University of Alberta, the University of Toronto, and UCSD. He currently works as a freelance composer and is based in San Francisco. His output consists of chamber, vocal, opera, electronic, solo/duo, and orchestral music.

Awards
 Finalist, Gaudeamus Foundation's Music Week, 2006
 SOCAN Awards for Young Composers, several prizes 2004–2009
 orkest de ereprijs International Young Composers Meeting 2009, first prize

See also

List of Canadian composers
 Music of Canada
AMP represents the music of Aaron Gervais, Paul Steenhuisen, Howard Bashaw, Keith Hamel, Bob Pritchard, James Harley, André Ristic, and Gordon Fitzell.

External links
Art Music Promotion website
Aaron Gervais's website
Aaron Gervais's Twitter site
Interview with Franz Waltmans
Interview with Charlie Wilmoth

1980 births
Living people
Canadian composers
Canadian male composers
MacEwan University alumni
Male classical composers
21st-century Canadian male musicians
21st-century classical composers